Ruben Berta International Airport  is the airport serving Uruguaiana, Brazil. It is named after Ruben Berta (1907–1966), third Manager-Director of Varig. Even though Ruben Berta was spelled as Ruben the airport's official name is spelled Rubem.

It is operated by CCR.

History 
The airport was commissioned in 1945 and the terminal building in 1968. On September 29, 1967, the airport was renamed after Ruben Berta.

Previously operated by Infraero, on April 7, 2021 CCR won a 30-year concession to operate the airport.

Airlines and destinations

Access 

See also 

List of airports in Brazil

References

External links 

Airports in Rio Grande do Sul
Airports established in 1945